Argei may refer to:
 Argei (dolls), ritual figures in ancient Roman religion, and also their shrines
 Argei (manufacturer) - olive oil manufacturer